The word mogwai is the transliteration of the Cantonese word  () meaning 'monster', 'evil spirit', 'devil' or 'demon'.

In Chinese culture
According to Chinese tradition, mogwai are certain demons, which often inflict harm on humans. They are said to reproduce sexually during mating seasons triggered by the coming of rain. Supposedly, they take care to breed at these times because rain signifies rich and full times ahead.

The term mo derives from the Sanskrit , meaning 'evil beings' (literally 'death'). In Hinduism and Buddhism, Mara determines fates of death and desire that tether people to an unending cycle of reincarnation and suffering. He leads people to sin, misdeeds, and self-destruction. Meanwhile, gwai does not necessarily mean 'evil' or demonic spirits. Classically, it simply means deceased spirits or souls of the dead. Nevertheless, in modern Chinese, it has evolved to refer usually to the dead spirits or ghosts of non-family members that may take vengeance on living humans who caused them pain when they were still living. It is common for the living to redress their sins by sacrificing money to gwai by burning (usually fake) paper banknotes so that gwai can have funds to use in their afterlife.

See also 
 Chinese mythology in popular culture
 Vengeful ghost
 Space Monster, Wangmagwi, 1967 South Korean kaijū film
 Gremlins, 1984 American comedy horror film

References

Asian demons
Chinese ghosts
Yaoguai